Dorranabad or Daranabad may refer to:
 Dorranabad, Anbarabad